The 2005 Dickies 500 was a NASCAR Nextel Cup Series stock car race, which was held on November 6, 2005, at Texas Motor Speedway (TMS) in Fort Worth, Texas. It was the inaugural running of the Dickies 500 after being created for the 2005 season.

Summary
The race was the 34th of the 2005 NASCAR Nextel Cup Series season, and the eighth race in the 2005 Chase for the NEXTEL Cup, and was the first race to be run under the lights at TMS. Track president Eddie Gossage later announced that the total purse money for the race was $6,815,880, then the largest in Chase history, and the fourth largest during the 2005 season, trailing the Daytona 500, the Allstate 400 at the Brickyard, and the Samsung/RadioShack 500.

The pole position was held by Penske Racing's Ryan Newman, and was won by Carl Edwards of Roush Racing. The race was created as a result of the Ferko lawsuit, which took out the Southern 500 at Darlington Raceway, along with the Subway 400 at North Carolina Speedway. The race featured six cautions, which at the time was the fewest at Texas Motor Speedway in a Nextel Cup race, and the  average speed which was also at the time the highest at the track in a Cup race.

Pole-sitter Ryan Newman was forced to start in the back after his car crashed on the second qualifying lap, and had to drive a backup car, and Matt Kenseth took over the pole position. Following the first caution flag, Greg Biffle passed Kenseth, but had to pit due to a loose wheel. Kenseth would dominate much of the race, leading a race-high 149 laps. Later in the race, with 11 laps remaining, Mark Martin did not change tires, and led on the restart. However, with two laps left, Carl Edwards, on newer tires, passed Martin and held him and Kenseth off for the victory by a margin of .584 seconds.

Top 20 finishers

 Kurt Busch
 Martin Truex Jr.
 Matt Kenseth
 Casey Mears
 Jimmie Johnson
 Tony Stewart
 Denny Hamlin
 Dale Earnhardt Jr.
 Elliott Sadler
 Mark Martin
 Jamie McMurray
 Dale Jarrett
 Ricky Rudd
 Jeff Gordon
 Kyle Busch
 Kevin Harvick
 Mike Bliss
 Jeff Green
 Brian Vickers
 Greg Biffle

Standings after the race

References

Dickies 500
Dickies 500
21st century in Fort Worth, Texas
NASCAR races at Texas Motor Speedway